Hamilton Thorp (born 21 August 1973) is an Australian former professional football player.

Early life
Thorp is one of a small number of professional footballers to grow up in Darwin.

Career

Club
In the early 1990s Thorp moved to England, where he spent a season with Rochdale.

Thorp played in the FAS Premier League as a teenager for Darwin Cubs.

In 1997, Thorp signed for English Football League First Division side Portsmouth on the recommendation of then-Australia manager Terry Venables. He played seven league matches and two Football League Cup games for the side, scoring one goal.

He later returned to Australia, moving from Perth Glory to Parramatta Power in 2000.

In 2003, Thorp played for Swedish side Norrköping, but was released after one season when the club elected not to take up a contractual option for a second year.

Thorp joined Norwegian club Raufoss in 2004, making 11 appearances and scoring once in the Norwegian First Division.

International
Thorp represented the Australian Schoolboys in the early 1990s.

Honours

Club
Perth Glory
 National Soccer League Premiership: 1999–2000

Individual
 NSW Super League Golden Boot: 2002

See also
 List of Perth Glory FC players

References

External links
Aussie Footballers Thomson to Tokich
 

1973 births
Living people
Australian soccer players
West Adelaide SC players
Portsmouth F.C. players
Perth Glory FC players
Parramatta Power players
Manly United FC players
Northern Spirit FC players
IFK Norrköping players
IF Sylvia players
Raufoss IL players
National Soccer League (Australia) players
English Football League players
Superettan players
Norwegian First Division players
Australian expatriate soccer players
Expatriate footballers in England
Australian expatriate sportspeople in England
Australian expatriate sportspeople in Sweden
Expatriate footballers in Sweden
Australian expatriate sportspeople in Norway
Expatriate footballers in Norway
Sportspeople from Darwin, Northern Territory
Association football forwards